The 2022 Big South Conference women's basketball tournament is the postseason women's basketball tournament for the Big South Conference for the 2021–22 season. It is being held from March 1–6, 2022 with all tournament games played at the Bojangles Coliseum in Charlotte, North Carolina. This is the first time since the 2016 edition that the tournament has been held at a single neutral site location. The tournament winner receives the conference's automatic bid to the NCAA tournament. The defending champions are the High Point Panthers.

Seeds 
With the addition of North Carolina A&T before the season, the conference increased its membership to 12 teams and split into divisions for the first time since 2013–14. The division winners were awarded the top two seeds, with the rest of the teams being seeded by record, with a tiebreaker system to seed teams with identical conference records.

The tiebreakers operate in the following order:

 Head-to-head record.
 Record against the top-ranked conference team not involved in the tie, going down the standings until the tie is broken. For this purpose, teams with the same conference record are considered collectively. If two teams were unbeaten or winless against an opponent but did not play the same number of games against that opponent, the tie is not considered broken.

Schedule

Bracket

References 

2021–22 Big South Conference women's basketball season
Big South Conference women's basketball tournament
Basketball competitions in Charlotte, North Carolina
Women's sports in North Carolina
Big South Conference women's basketball tournament
College sports tournaments in North Carolina
2022 in sports in North Carolina